Jaden Edward Dhananjay Ivey (born February 13, 2002) is an American professional basketball player for the Detroit Pistons of the National Basketball Association (NBA). He played college basketball for the Purdue Boilermakers.

Early life and high school career
Ivey grew up playing football, basketball and soccer and practicing karate. He started focusing on basketball as a freshman in high school. Ivey played for Marian High School in Mishawaka, Indiana in his first three years. For his senior season, he transferred to La Lumiere School in La Porte, Indiana, joining one of the top programs in the country. A consensus four-star recruit, he committed to playing college basketball for Purdue over offers from Butler and Notre Dame.

College career

Early in his freshman season, Ivey missed five games with a foot injury. On January 19, 2021, he made a game-winning three-pointer with five seconds left as part of a 15-point performance in a 67–65 win over Ohio State. On March 19, Ivey scored a season-high 26 points in a 78–69 overtime loss to North Texas at the first round of the NCAA tournament. As a freshman, he averaged 11.1 points and 3.3 rebounds per game, earning Big Ten All-Freshman Team honors. 

On November 12, 2021, Ivey scored 27 points in a 92–67 win over Indiana State. On January 30, 2022, he scored 21 points and hit the game-winning three-pointer with 0.6 seconds remaining in an 81–78 win over Ohio State. As a sophomore, he averaged 17.3 points, 4.9 rebounds and 3.1 assists per game. Ivey was named to the First Team All-Big Ten as well as the All-American Second Team. On March 31, 2022, Ivey declared for the 2022 NBA draft, forgoing his remaining college eligibility. He was a projected top five pick in the draft.

Professional career

Detroit Pistons (2022–present)
Ivey was selected with the fifth overall pick in the 2022 NBA draft by the Detroit Pistons. He made his summer league debut on July 7 against the Portland Trail Blazers with 20 points, six rebounds, and six assists in an 81–78 win. On October 19, Ivey made his regular season debut, putting up 19 points along with three rebounds and four assists in a 113–109 win over the Orlando Magic. On December 20, Ivey scored a career-high 30 points during a 126–111 loss to the Utah Jazz.

National team career
Ivey played for the United States at the 2021 FIBA Under-19 World Cup in Latvia. On July 3, 2021, he scored a team-high 21 points, shooting 7-of-11 from the field, in a 83–54 group stage win over Turkey. Ivey averaged 12.3 points per game, helping his team win the gold medal, and was named to the all-tournament team.

Career statistics

College

|-
| style="text-align:left;"| 2020–21
| style="text-align:left;"| Purdue
| 23 || 12 || 24.2 || .399 || .258 || .726 || 3.3 || 1.9 || .7 || .7 || 11.1
|-
| style="text-align:left;"| 2021–22
| style="text-align:left;"| Purdue
| 36 || 34 || 31.4 || .460 || .358 || .744 || 4.9 || 3.1 || .9 || .6 || 17.3
|- class="sortbottom"
| style="text-align:center;" colspan="2"| Career
| 59 || 46 || 28.6 || .440 || .322 || .739 || 4.3 || 2.6 || .8 || .6 || 14.9

Personal life
Ivey's mother, Niele Ivey, serves as head women's basketball coach at Notre Dame. She played in the WNBA for five seasons and was an All-American player at Notre Dame. Jaden’s father, Javin Hunter, played for the Baltimore Ravens and San Francisco 49ers in the NFL. His grandfather, James Hunter, also played in the NFL for the Detroit Lions. Ivey has one paternal half-brother, Jordan Hunter. 

Ivey is a Christian.

References

External links

Purdue Boilermakers bio
USA Basketball bio

2002 births
Living people
All-American college men's basketball players
American men's basketball players
Basketball players from South Bend, Indiana
Detroit Pistons draft picks
Detroit Pistons players
La Lumiere School alumni
Purdue Boilermakers men's basketball players
Shooting guards